Charles C. Bradley  (1911 – May 18, 2002) was a professor in geology at the Montana State College. He received his bachelor's degree, masters, and doctorate degrees from University of Wisconsin–Madison.

Family
Bradley was the great-grandson of the American missionary to Siam Dan Beach Bradley, the grandson of English professor and Thai linguist Cornelius Beach Bradley, and the son of biochemistry professor Harold Cornelius Bradley.

References

External links
 Biography of Charles C. Bradley

1911 births
2002 deaths
Scientists from Chicago
People from Baraboo, Wisconsin
University of Wisconsin–Madison alumni
Montana State University faculty
20th-century American geologists